The Vazuza, a river in the  Novoduginsky and  Sychyovsky districts of Smolensk Oblast and in the Zubtsovsky District of Tver Oblast, Russia, becomes a right tributary of the Volga. Soviet engineers flooded the lower part of the river to form the Vazuza Reservoir. The towns of Sychyovka and Zubtsov are located on the banks the Vazuza (the latter at its confluence with the Volga). The main tributaries of the Vazuza are the Kasnya, the Gzhat (both right), the Losmina and the Osuga (left).

The source of the Vazuza is located east of the village of  Lukino in Novoduginsky District. The river flows north, crosses into Sychyovsky District, and downstream of the town of Sychyovka turns east. Several kilometers downstream from Sychyovka the reservoir begins, and all major tributaries of the Vazuza form bays in the reservoir. The Vazuza accepts the Kasnya from the right and turns northeast. Downstream of the mouth of the Gzhat it makes a short stretch of a border between Tver and Smolensk Oblasts, flowing northwest, and further downstream turns northeast and deviates from the border into Tver Oblast. The dam of the reservoirs is located several kilometers upstream from the mouth of the Vazuza and several kilometers downstream from the mouth of the Osuga. 

The drainage basin of the Vazuza includes the major part of Sychyovsky District, the eastern part of Novoduginsky District, the northern parts of  Gagarinsky and Vyazemsky Districts of Smolensk Oblast, as well as the southern parts of Zubtsovsky and Rzhevsky Districts and minor areas in the eastern part of Oleninsky District in Tver Oblast. The towns of Zubtsov, Sychyovka, and Gagarin, as well as the selo of Novodugino, the administrative center of Novoduginsky District, are all located in the drainage basin of the Vazuza.

References

Rivers of Smolensk Oblast
Rivers of Tver Oblast